Georgios Sikalias (born 25 March 1986) is a Greek professional footballer who plays as a goalkeeper for Super League 2 club Egaleo.

Honours
 PAS Giannina
Greek Second Division: 2009, 2011

References

External links
Profile at epae.org

Living people
1986 births
Panathinaikos F.C. players
Ethnikos Piraeus F.C. players
PAS Giannina F.C. players
Super League Greece players
Panachaiki F.C. players
Koropi F.C. players
Panthrakikos F.C. players
Iraklis Psachna F.C. players
Athlitiki Enosi Larissa F.C. players
AO Chania F.C. players
Trikala F.C. players
A.E. Karaiskakis F.C. players
Doxa Drama F.C. players
Association football goalkeepers
Footballers from Athens
Greek footballers